The 2019 Charnwood Borough Council election took place on 2 May 2019 to elect members of the Charnwood Borough Council in England. This was on the same day as other local elections.

Summary

|-

Ward results

Anstey

Barrow & Sileby

Birstall Wanlip

Birstall Watermead

East Goscote

Forest Bradgate

Loughborough Ashby

Loughborough Dishley & Hathern

Loughborough Garendon

Loughborough Hastings

Loughborough Lemyngton

Loughborough Nanpantan

Loughborough Outwoods

Loughborough Shelthorpe

Loughborough Southfields

Loughborough Storer

Mountsorrel

Queniborough

Quorn & Mountsorrel Castle

Rothley & Thurcaston

Shepshed East

Shepshed West

Sileby

Syston East

Syston West

The Wolds

Thurmaston

Wreake Villages

By-elections

Shepshed West

Loughborough Shelthorpe

References

2019 English local elections
May 2019 events in the United Kingdom
2019
2010s in Leicestershire